Abron is a surname. Notable people with the surname include:

 Armin Abron (born 1975), American dentist
 DeAndrey Abron (1972-2020), American boxer
 Donta Abron (born 1972), American football player

References